San Martín River may refer to:

San Martín River (Bolivia), a river in Beni Department
San Martín River (Mexico), a river in Jalisco State